Heri Township (Mandarin: 和日乡) is a township under the jurisdiction of Zêkog County, Huangnan Tibetan Autonomous Prefecture, Qinghai, China. In 2010, Heri Township had a total population of 10,881: 5,563 males and 5,318 females: 3,354 aged under 14, 6,983 aged between 15 and 65 and 544 aged over 65.

References 

Huangnan Tibetan Autonomous Prefecture
Township-level divisions of Qinghai